Asa Biggs (1811–1878) was a U.S. Senator from North Carolina from 1855 to 1858. Senator Biggs may refer to:

Andy Biggs (born 1958), Arizona State Senate
D. E. Biggs (1860–1924), Washington State Senate